Manchester is a city in the North West of England, historically in Lancashire. 

Manchester may also refer to:

 Greater Manchester, a metropolitan county and combined authority area in northwest England
 Greater Manchester Urban Area, the large conurbation that encompasses much of Greater Manchester 
 Greater Manchester Statutory City Region, Greater Manchester and five boroughs
 Manchester (ancient parish), was an ancient ecclesiastical parish
 Manchester (ancient township), one of the townships in the ancient parish of Manchester 
 Manchester (HM Prison), a men's prison ("Strangeways") in Manchester, England
 Manchester (UK Parliament constituency), 1654–1660 and 1832–1885

Places

In Australia
 County of Manchester, cadastral unit in South Australia.

In Canada
 Alyth/Bonnybrook/Manchester, Calgary, a neighbourhood in Calgary, Alberta
 Manchester, Nova Scotia, small community in Guysborough

In Jamaica
 Manchester Parish

In South America
 Manchester, Bolivia
 Manchester, Suriname

In the United States
 Manchester, California, in Mendocino County
 Manchester, Monterey County, California, a ghost town near Big Sur
 Manchester, Connecticut, a New England town
 Manchester (CDP), Connecticut, the urban portion of the town
 Manchester, Georgia
 Manchester, Illinois
 Manchester, Indiana
 Manchester, Montgomery County, Indiana
 Manchester Township, Dearborn County, Indiana
 Manchester, Iowa
 Manchester, Kansas
 Manchester, Kentucky
 Manchester, Maine
 Manchester, Maryland
 Manchester-by-the-Sea, Massachusetts, often referred to as just "Manchester"
 Manchester, Michigan
 Manchester, Minnesota
 Manchester, Missouri
 Manchester, New Hampshire, the largest Manchester in the U.S. and largest city in New Hampshire
 Manchester Township, New Jersey
 Manchester (town), New York
 Manchester (village), New York
 Manchester, Ohio
 Manchester, Oklahoma
 Manchester, Pennsylvania
 Manchester (Pittsburgh), a neighborhood in Pittsburgh, Pennsylvania
 Manchester, South Dakota
 Manchester, Tennessee
 Manchester, Houston, Texas
 Manchester, Vermont
 Manchester Center, Vermont
 Manchester, Virginia, now part of Richmond
 Manchester, Washington
 Manchester (community), Green Lake County, Wisconsin, an unincorporated community
 Manchester, Green Lake County, Wisconsin, a town
 Manchester, Jackson County, Wisconsin, a town

Education
The University of Manchester, an institution of higher education in England
Manchester University (Indiana), an institution of higher learning in Indiana, USA
The Victoria University of Manchester, a predecessor of the University of Manchester, in existence from 1903 to 2004

Vehicles
 Avro 533 Manchester, a twin-engine biplane photo-reconnaissance and bomber aircraft of 1918
 Avro Manchester, a twin-engine heavy bomber used by the RAF during World War II
 Manchester (barque), a four-masted British barque
 HMS Manchester, the name of three ships of the Royal Navy
 USS Manchester, the name of two ships of the United States Navy

Transport hubs

Airports
 Manchester Airport (MAN), near Manchester, England
 Manchester–Boston Regional Airport (MHT), near Manchester, New Hampshire, United States
 Manchester Woodford Aerodrome, near Manchester, England, closed in 2011
 City Airport Manchester, formerly Manchester Barton Aerodrome, Manchester, England

Bus stations
 Manchester station (Los Angeles Metro), United States

Rail stations
 Manchester Piccadilly station, the principal railway station in Manchester, England
 Manchester Oxford Road railway station, the second busiest railway station in Manchester, England
 Manchester Victoria station, the third busiest railway station in Manchester, England
 Manchester station group, a station group of four railway stations in Manchester, England
 Manchester station (MBTA), in Massachusetts, United States
 Manchester Union Station, in New Hampshire, United States, closed in 1967

Music
 Manchester (album), an album by Tim Barry
 "Manchester" (song), a 2006 song by the Beautiful South
 "Manchester" (The Times song), a 1990 single by The Times
 "Manchester, England", a song from Hair

Sports

Football (soccer)
Premier League
Manchester City F.C.
Manchester United F.C.
 Manchester United (video game series)
Other
Manchester F.C. (disambiguation), several teams

Ice hockey
Manchester Monarchs (AHL), operated 2001–2015 in New Hampshire, United States
Manchester Monarchs (ECHL), operated 2015–2019 in New Hampshire, United States
Manchester Phoenix, operated 2003–2017 in England
Manchester Storm (1995–2002), in England
Manchester Storm (2015–), in England

Other
Manchester Silkworms, a collegiate baseball team in Connecticut, United States
Manchester Rugby Club, in England

Science and technology
 Manchester capitalism,  a capitalist intellectual movement of the 19th century, pioneered by John Stuart Mill and Adam Smith, amongst others, and also known as the "Manchester school" of economics
 The Manchester School, an academic journal of economics
 Manchester cloth, also known as Corduroy
 Manchester code, an electronic transmission method used for communication
 Manchester Mark 1, an early British computer
 Manchester school (anthropology), a school of thought in anthropology
 Manchester score, a system of assessing small-cell lung cancer
 Manchester Ship Canal
 Manchester, the name of a variant of the Athlon 64 X2 CPU

People

Groups
 Manchester Regiment, also The Manchesters, a British Army regiment
 Manchester Pals, World War I Army regiments formed by Lord Kitchener

Surname
 Devon Manchester (born 1989), New Zealand field hockey player
 Doug Manchester (born 1942), American real estate developer and newspaper owner
 Glen Manchester (born 1965), English innovator and entrepreneur
 Melissa Manchester (born 1951), American singer-songwriter
 Roy C. Manchester (1887–1975), American Boy Scout executive
 Susan Manchester (born 1987), American politician in Ohio
 Tre Manchester (born 1992), American writer, director, and producer
 William Manchester (1922–2004), American historian and biographer

Title
 Duke of Manchester or Earl of Manchester, a title of the Peerage of the United Kingdom from 1626 to date

Other
 "Manchester" (The West Wing), two-part episodes of the show
 Manchester Terrier, a breed of dog
 Manchester Arena bombing
 Manchester, a term used in Australia, New Zealand and South Africa for bedding and linens

See also
Manchester High School (disambiguation)
 Manchester school (disambiguation)
Manchester Township (disambiguation)
Madchester (musical genre)